The Temple of Bona Dea was an ancient sanctuary in Ancient Rome, erected the 3rd century BC and dedicated to the goddess Bona Dea. 

The date of the foundation is unknown. However, the cult was introduced in Rome after 272 BC, and the sanctuary was founded in that century. It is mentioned to have been repaired by the empress Livia, spouse of Emperor Augustus.

The sanctuary was a center of healing in Rome. Domesticated snakes were housed in the temple, and medicinal herbs were sold. It was the center of the cult of the festival of Bona Dea, which was celebrated on 1 May. During the festival, no men were allowed within the borders of the sanctuary.  

The Temple of Bona Dea was still in use during the 3rd century. If still in use by the 4th-century, it would have been closed during the persecution of pagans in the late Roman Empire. A church was erected in the area of the temple in the 5th-century.

See also
List of Ancient Roman temples

References

Bona Dea
Roman temples by deity
3rd-century BC religious buildings and structures